This is a table of permselectivity for different substances in the glomerulus of the kidney in renal filtration.

References

Physiology